Asif Sultan, also known as Aasif Sultan, is a Kashmiri journalist who has been jailed since August 2018.  On October 17, 2019, Sultan received the annual John Aubuchon Press Freedom Award by the National Press Club of America. In April 2022, Aasif was granted bail but not released, instead he was re-arrested and booked under the Public Safety Act.

History

In 2018 Sultan, as a politics and human rights journalist in Indian-administered Jammu and Kashmir for the monthly Srinagar-based Kashmir Narrator.  He was reporting on civil unrest in Kashmir, including interviewing alleged members of militant groups, and was arrested on 27 August 2018 under the stringent Unlawful Activities (Prevention) Act.  Sultan was refused bail and his trial only began in Jun 2019.

Aasif Sultan published 'The rise of Burhan Wani', the profile of Kashmiri militant and the real reason of his framing in the case and later brazenly acknowledged by the police in the Public Safety Act dossier. The establishment did not like his journalist work on Burhan Wani who was killed in 2016.

Committee to Protect Journalists and various other international organisations have demanded release of Aasif Sultan.

In April 2022, Aasif was granted bail but was not released, instead re-arrested and booked under the Public Safety Act and continued unabated witch hunt of journalists in Kashmir.

Works

Awards
 John Aubuchon Press Freedom Award (2019)

References

Kashmiri journalists
Prisoners and detainees of India
Recipients of John Aubuchon Press Freedom Award
Imprisoned journalists
1986 births
Living people
Kashmiri Muslims
Kashmiri people
Kashmiri writers